DLA may refer to:

Entities and organizations

 DLA Piper, an international law firm
 DLA (TV), a Latin American television provider
 Defense Logistics Agency, United States
 Democratic Left Alliance, a Polish political party
 Dental Laboratories Association
 Douala International Airport, IATA airport code

Science and technology

 Deep Learning Accelerator
 Drive Letter Access, a packet writing utility
 Drive letter assignment
 Drive Lock Assembly, a component of the Solar Alpha Rotary Joint
 Digital Logic Analyzer, a diagnostic tool for digital circuits
 Doctor Liberalium Artium (Doctor of Liberal Arts), a degree
 Dog leukocyte antigen
 Diffusion-limited aggregation
 Damped Lyman-alpha system
 Dual-Lumen Airway, an emergency airway device

Legislation and policy

 Disability Living Allowance, disability benefits in the UK
 Driver License Agreement
 Dominion Lands Act (Canada, 1872)